Blue Township is an inactive township in Jackson County, in the U.S. state of Missouri.

Blue Township was established in 1827, taking its name from the Blue River.

In 1930, the township included the city of Independence as well as the villages of Atherton, Sugar Creek, Courtney, Cement City, and East Independence.

Further reading
 Missouri atlas (archived), including Jackson County circa 1930

References

Townships in Missouri
Townships in Jackson County, Missouri